Regiment Potchefstroom Universiteit (Afrikaans for Potchefstroom University Regiment) is an artillery regiment of the South African Army. As a reserve unit, it has a status roughly equivalent to that of a British Army Reserve or United States Army National Guard unit. It is part of the South African Army Artillery Formation.

History

1 Observation Battery
The original regiment was formed in 1946, when the South African Army was reorganised for peacetime.  It was initially called 1 Observation Battery, and in 1950 it was renamed 1 Observation Regiment.

On being affiliated with the Potchefstroom University in 1960, it was given the name Regiment Potchefstroomse Universiteit.

Structure
In terms of organisation the regiment was structured with:
a RHQ and Radar Battery at University of Potchefstroom,
a Survey Battery at the University of the Orange Free State and
 an Observation and Sound Ranging Battery at the University of Pretoria.

Affiliated Division
During the bush war the regiment served with:

 8th South African Armoured Division
 82 Mechanised Brigade It was mobilised with the brigade in 1988 for Operation Packer and Operation Displace.

and with

 7 South African Infantry Division

Amalgamation with 25 Field Regiment
25 Field Regiment was amalgamated with Potchefstroom University (RPU) during September 1991.

Regimental Emblems

Insignia

References

South African Army
Artillery regiments of South Africa
Military units and formations in Potchefstroom
Military units and formations established in 1946